is a Japanese romantic comedy manga series written and illustrated by Shoko Conami. It was serialized in Princess magazine from July 2006 to March 2012. The individual chapters were collected and published in thirteen  volumes by Akita Shoten. The manga was licensed for an English-language release by Tokyopop, which published seven volumes before shutting down in 2011. Akita Shoten completed the English translation and published the entire series digitally from 2018 to 2019.

Characters
  is a ninja and the bodyguard of Princess Beni (Red Princess). He went to the future when a bomb exploded beneath his feet and he fell into the lake with the Red Princess because of pursuers, at the beginning of the manga. There, he meets a girl who shares the same name and face of the princess he had sworn to protect. Time and time again, he proves his loyalty to the highschool girl, who has no idea why he's protecting her with such loyalty. He refused to hurt Takezaki (Beni's father's secretary), who had supposedly kidnapped Beni, only because Beni told him that she did not want to see Kagetora kill anyone. Kagetora's self-restraint shows when he is tasered by Takezaki but still does not fight back until allowed by Beni. While on a roof with Beni, where they had first met, Beni trips and falls off, he jumps over, and the next thing they know, they're back in the past. He eventually realizes that he time-warped into the time of the princess's descendant, who looks very similar to her, and that he must love and protect Beni Fujiwara.
  is a high school girl who is a distant descendant of the Red Princess. Due to her rich family background, she gets kidnapped often. Throughout the story she mentions to Kagetora that she just wishes to die in a way that would be her father's fault—disturbing Kagetora quite a bit. Although she feels that Kagetora's loyalty is rather eccentric, she eventually falls in love with Kagetora, as he does with her. Later on, Kagetora discovers that she is not the princess, but rather her granddaughter look-alike. Beni finds out that she is betrothed to another man (Iwatsuru Rihito) whom she doesn't wish to marry.  She even goes through extreme measures to try to exit the marriage.
  is a princess of a country. While being pursued, an explosion happens and she falls into a lake, losing her right hand as well as her memory. A passerby finds her in the lake, confused and scared, so he takes her in. Soon, she marries that man and becomes pregnant with his child. When seeing Kagetora again, she remembers everything about her past. But even then, she refuses to return to her palace of riches, for she loves her husband. She tells Kagetora to leave and to tell her subjects that the princess is dead.

Publication
Shinobi Life began as a series of one-shots published in Akita Shoten's  manga magazine Princess in 2005 and 2006. A full-scale serialization began in the August 2006 issue of Princess on July 6, 2006, concluding in the April 2012 issue on March 6, 2012. A bonus spin-off story was published in the May 2012 issue on April 6, 2012. Akita Shoten collected the chapters into thirteen  volumes published under its Princess Comics imprint. Tokyopop licensed the series in English and published seven volumes before shutting down its North American publishing division in 2011. Akita Shoten completed the English translation, publishing all thirteen volumes as digital e-books from 2018 to 2019. Shinobi Life is also licensed in French by Kazé, in German by Egmont Manga & Anime, and in Chinese by Sharp Point Press.

Volume list

References

External links
 
 Shinobi Life at Tokyopop (defunct; link via the Wayback Machine)
 Manga News review 
 Manga Sanctuary review 

2006 manga
Adventure anime and manga
Akita Shoten manga
Comedy anime and manga
Ninja in anime and manga
Romance anime and manga
Sharp Point Press titles
Shōjo manga
Tokyopop titles